Radui is a village in Southern Bulgaria. The village is located in Pernik Municipality, Pernik Province. Аccording to the numbers provided by the 2020 Bulgarian census, Radui currently has a population of 61 people with a permanent address registration in the settlement.

Geography 
Radui village is located in Western Bulgaria in Municipality Pernik, 20 kilometers away from Pernik. The village lies at the foot of Viskyar mountain and borders Lyulin mountain. The average elevation of the village is 771 meters.

Two kilometers west of the village, the remains of an ancient fortress have been discovered, signifying that the area had previously been occupied before the Middle Ages.

The first written proof of the village's existence dates back to 1452.

Radui village is a protected geographical bird area. It lies in a continental climate area, while only the part of the village above 750 meters elevation, is specified as mountain climate.

History 
According to the Ottoman texts, the village was moved 2 times due to Bulgarians running from Ottoman rule. It has been relocated by 2-3 kilometers from its previous location.

Legends say that the name of the village stems from three brothers looking for a place to live. One of the villagers found the place and exclaimed for everyone to rejoice, hence the name “Radui” which means joy in the Bulgarian language.

Ethnicity 
According to the Bulgarian population census in 2011.

References 

Villages in Pernik Province